The 2015 NCAA Division III Men's Ice Hockey Tournament was the culmination of the 2014–15 season, the 32nd such tournament in NCAA history. It concluded with Trinity defeating Wisconsin–Stevens Point in the championship game 5-2. All First Round and Quarterfinal matchups were held at home team venues, while all succeeding games were played at the Ridder Arena in Minneapolis, Minnesota.

Qualifying teams
The following teams qualified for the tournament. Automatic bids were offered to the conference tournament champion of seven different conferences. Four at-large bids were available for the highest-ranked non-automatic qualifiers (overall seed in parentheses).

Format
The tournament featured four rounds of play. All rounds were Single-game elimination. The top two teams from each region received byes into the quarterfinal round. These teams were arranged so they were all four to reach the semifinal round the second eastern seed would play the top western seed and vise versa.

Because only three western teams received byes for the tournament, the third western seed was given the remaining bye into the quarterfinals and matched against the second western seed.

the remaining six eastern teams were placed in the first round and seeded as follows: the second eastern seed would play the eighth eastern seed, the fourth eastern seed would play the seventh eastern seed and the fifth eastern seed would play the sixth eastern seed. The winner between the fifth- and six-seeded teams, would advance to play the top overall seed. Because the fourth overall seed was required to play in the first round as the third eastern seed, the winner of its first round match would advance to play the second overall seed rather than the third overall seed. This was done to divide top four seeds evenly between the two semifinal brackets.

In the First Round and Quarterfinals the higher-seeded team served as host.

Tournament Bracket

Note: * denotes overtime period(s)

All-Tournament Team
G: Nathaniel Heibron* (Trinity)
D: Alex Brooks (Wisconsin–Stevens Point)
D: Michael Flynn (Trinity)
F: Nick D'Avolio (Wisconsin–Stevens Point)
F: Michael Hawkrigg (Trinity)
F: Sean Orlando (Trinity)
* Most Outstanding Player(s)

Record by conference

References

External links
Division III Men's Ice Hockey Record Book

 
NCAA Division III ice hockey